Robert Meiklejohn (20 December 18897 July 1974) was Archdeacon of Norwich from 1954 to 1961.

Meiklejohn was educated at Haberdashers' Aske's and King's College, London. He was ordained in 1914. He was a Royal Naval chaplain from 1915 to 1919. He was vicar of Dorrington, Shropshire, from 1920 to 1925; a chaplain with the Missions to Seamen from 1926 to 1929; rector of Felbrigg with Metton from 1930 (and Sustead from 1947) to April 1961; and rural dean of Repps from 1945 to 1954. He retired as Archdeacon in mid-1961, and was made archdeacon emeritus around November that year.

References

1889 births
1974 deaths
20th-century English Anglican priests
People educated at Haberdashers' Boys' School
Archdeacons of Norwich
Alumni of King's College London